Marilynn Roberge Malerba (born August 17, 1953) is an American tribal leader and former nurse who is the lifetime chief of the Mohegan Tribe and the Treasurer of the United States.

Early life and education 
Malerba's mother holds the position of Tribal Nonner, an elder female of respect, and her great-grandfather was Chief Matagha (Burrill Fielding), a position he held from 1937 until he died in 1952.

Malerba studied nursing at Hartford Hospital College of Nursing, and then earned a Bachelor of Science from St. Joseph's College (now known as the University of Saint Joseph) in West Hartford, Connecticut, in 1983. She later earned a Master of Public Administration from the University of Connecticut and a Doctor of Nursing Practice from Yale University.

Personal life 
Malerba is married to Paul Malerba; they are the parents of two adult daughters, Elizabeth and Angela. They have three grandchildren.

Career 
Malerba worked as a nurse at Hartford Hospital and then moved to Lawrence + Memorial Hospital in Connecticut where she would become the head of cardiology and pulmonary services.

Within the Mohegan Tribe she has been the chair of the tribal council, and worked as executive director of the health and human services department. Malerba was named the 18th chief of the Mohegan Tribe on August 15, 2010, and is the first female chief in modern history to hold this position. She serves on the United States Department of Justice Tribal Nations Leadership Council, and joined the Indian Health Service's Tribal Advisory Committee in 2015, a committee she leads as of 2022.

On June 21, 2022, President Joe Biden announced his intent to appoint Malerba to serve as Treasurer of the United States; she was sworn in on September 12, 2022 and is the first Native American to hold this position. Before her swearing-in, the office of treasurer had been vacant for more than two and a half years, the longest vacancy in the history of the United States Treasury.

Selected publications

Awards and honors 
Malerba has honorary doctoral degrees from Eastern Connecticut State University and the University of Saint Joseph.

References

External links

1953 births
Living people
20th-century Native American women
20th-century Native Americans
21st-century Native American women
21st-century Native Americans
American nurses
Biden administration personnel
Mohegan people
Treasurers of the United States
Tribal chiefs
University of Saint Joseph (Connecticut) alumni
American women nurses
Yale University alumni